The 1984–85 snooker season was a series of snooker tournaments played between July 1984 and May 1985. The following table outlines the results for the ranking and the invitational events.


Calendar

Official rankings 

The top 16 of the world rankings, these players automatically played in the final rounds of the world ranking events and were invited for the Masters.

Notes

References

1984
Season 1985
Season 1984